Cyril Herbert Williams  (1908-1983) was Provincial Commissioner of the Nyanza Province of Kenya (1951–56).

Life
Cyril Herbert Williams was born on 27 December 1908, the son of Thomas Ethelbert Williams.  He was educated at Bedford Modern School and Jesus College, Cambridge.  In 1929 he played for Cambridge in the Varsity Match, earning a blue, and also played for Bedford in the 1930–31 season.

Williams entered the colonial service in Kenya in 1931, later becoming Provincial Commissioner of the Nyanza Province (1951–56), a member of the Kenya Council of State (1961–64) and Chairman of Naivasha County Council (1963).  He was invested as an Officer of the Order of the British Empire in 1949 and a Companion of the Order of St Michael and St George in 1956.

Williams married Patricia Joy Collyer on 15 February 1936.  They had a son and twin daughters.  Williams died on 27 November 1983.

References

1908 births
1983 deaths
Officers of the Order of the British Empire
Companions of the Order of St Michael and St George
Alumni of Jesus College, Cambridge
People educated at Bedford Modern School
Colonial Administrative Service officers
Cambridge University R.U.F.C. players
Bedford Blues players
British Kenya people